The 2004 World Judo Juniors Championships was an edition of the World Judo Juniors Championships, organised by the International Judo Federation. It was held in Budapest, Hungary from 14 to 17 October 2004.

Medal summary

Men's events

Women's events

Source Results

Medal table

References

External links
 

World Judo Junior Championships
World Championships, U21
Judo
World 2004
Judo
Judo, World Championships U21